This is a list of films which have placed number one at the weekly box office in the United Kingdom during 1989.

Number one films

Highest-grossing films
Highest-grossing films in the U.K. between 1 December 1988 and 21 December 1989

Notes

See also 
 List of British films — British films by year
 Lists of box office number-one films

References

Chronology

1989
United Kingdom
Box office number-one films